FK Slavija (Serbian Cyrillic: ФК Cлaвиja Hoви Caд) is a football club based in Novi Sad, Serbia.

History
OFK Slavija was founded in 1926, and is one of the oldest football clubs in town.
During the 1990s, Novi Sad's OFK Slavija was led by Branislav "Dugi" Lainović, a prominent member of Serbian underworld. He performed the duties of FK Slavija's club president. Lainović was murdered on March 20, 2000 in Belgrade in front of Hotel Srbija on Ustanička Street.

References

External links
 FK Slavija Novi Sad at SrbijaSport

Football clubs in Vojvodina
Football clubs in Novi Sad
Association football clubs established in 1926
1926 establishments in Serbia